The 2015–16 Hartford Hawks men's basketball team  represented the University of Hartford during the 2015–16 NCAA Division I men's basketball season. The Hawks, led by sixth year head coach John Gallagher, played their home games at the Chase Arena at Reich Family Pavilion and were members of the America East Conference. They finished the season 10–23, 4–12 in America East play to finish in a tie for seventh place. They defeated Albany in the quarterfinals of the American East tournament to advance to the semifinals where they lost to Stony Brook.

Roster

Schedule

|-
!colspan=9 style="background:#; color:#FFFFFF;"| Exhibition

|-
!colspan=9 style="background:#; color:#FFFFFF;"| Non-conference regular season

|-
!colspan=9 style="background:#; color:#FFFFFF;"| America East regular season

|-
!colspan=9 style="background:#; color:#FFFFFF;"| America East tournament

References

Hartford Hawks men's basketball seasons
Hartford
Hartford Hawks men's b
Hartford Hawks men's b